Bainu ("how are you?") is a Chinese social networking website written in the Mongolian language.  it had about 400,000 users, concentrated in Inner Mongolia.

It was reported by Voice of America (VOA) that the Chinese authorities blocked Bainu on 23 August 2020 in order to prohibit Mongolians from discussing the issue of the authorities’ implementation of "bilingual education" in elementary schools.

References

External links
 Bainu 

Chinese websites
Social media
Mongolian-language computing